Lafayette Transit System (LTS) is the operator of public transportation in metropolitan Lafayette, Louisiana.

Routes
Thirteen (13) routes run daily except on Sunday, generally functioning at half hour or hour intervals. During the late evening and late night hours, buses keep running, with four routes covering specific zones of the city. All LTS buses are low floor and handicapped accessible, and each also features a bike rack.

Fixed-route bus service times are Monday through Saturday 5:45 AM - 10:30 PM.  Beginning at 6:35 PM, LTS begins its Night Owl fixed route service with four (4) consolidated bus routes serving citizens from the Rosa Parks Transportation Center every hour. Last regular route buses depart from the Transportation Center at 9:30P M nightly.

LTS does not provide bus service on: New Year's Day, Martin Luther King Jr. Day, Mardi Gras Day, Good Friday, Memorial Day, Independence Day, Labor Day, Thanksgiving Day, and Christmas Day.

Route list
10 Twelfth St.
15 Congress St./ UHC 
20 Cameron St.
25 Johnson St./ Settlers Trace/ South Regional Library 
30 MLK Ave/N. University Ave.
35 Madeline Ave.
45 Moss St.
50 Pierce Street 
55a Oil Center/Kaliste Saloom/ LGMC
55b UL Lafayette/ Oil Center/S college 
60 Louisiana Ave.
70 Pinhook Rd/Kaliste Saloon Rd./Lourdes 
101 Red Route (Johnston/Ambassador Caffery/Kaliste Saloom/ Pinhook Rd.)
102 Green Route (Congress/Ambassador Caffery/Johnston)
103 Blue Route (Twelfth/La Avenue/Moss/Gloria Switch)
104 Brown Route (Pierce/Madeline/Cameron/MLK/University/Walker Rd.)

External links
 

Bus transportation in Louisiana
Transit agencies in Louisiana